Christ Church, also known as Christ Episcopal Church, is a historic Episcopal church located at Sparkill in Rockland County, New York. It was designed by architect Charles Babcock (1829–1913) and built in 1864–1865.  It is a Gothic Revival style bluestone rubble church.  The stone transepts and bell tower were added in 1892, and the stone entrance porch was added around 1900.  It has a steeply pitched gable roof and Gothic arched openings.  Also on the property is the contributing parish house (c. 1870, c. 1900-1910) and gatepost.

It was listed on the National Register of Historic Places in 2011.

References

External links
church website

Episcopal church buildings in New York (state)
Churches on the National Register of Historic Places in New York (state)
Gothic Revival church buildings in New York (state)
Churches completed in 1865
Churches in Rockland County, New York
National Register of Historic Places in Rockland County, New York